"Der Arbeitsmann" (English: The workman) is an art song for voice and piano composed by Richard Strauss  in 1889, setting a poem by the German poet Richard Dehmel. The song is part of the collection  (English: Five songs for high voice with piano accompaniment). Strauss orchestrated the song in 1918.

Composition history

Strauss set 11 poems by the German poet Richard Dehmel over the period 1895-1901, four of them in his Opus 39 collection (Leises Lied, Befreit and Lied am meinem Sohn being the other Opus 39 Dehmel settings) and another the 1899 orchestral song Notturno. Dehmel was a controversial figure in the Germany of Kaiser Wilhelm II, a socialist who had been convicted for blasphemy in Berlin during 1897. He was the same age as Strauss, and “Dehmel worked squarely within the aesthetic territory occupied by Strauss”. Whilst Strauss had little interest in the politics of Dehmel, he shared the Nietzschean perspective that human lives are lived among and controlled by physical forces.  Whilst the two had corresponded for several years, they first met on March 23, 1899 (Hugo von Hofmannsthal was accompanying Dehmel, and also met Strauss for the first time).

According to Norman Del Mar, "Strauss was the last one to become involved in social reform, but where his art was concerned he was equally fearless in his adoption of inflammatory subject-material. Hence, when during his study of Dehmel his eye lighted upon this stirring poem of protest, he entertained no more thought of the disapproval it might arouse than he would a few years later, over the sexual extravagances of Wilde's Salome. To him, here was a magnificent vehicle for music, and of it he made one of his very greatest songs, full of drama and pathos".    Alan Jefferson wrote:  Der Arbeitsmann...is a hard and remorseless setting to equally rough and rugged words that express extreme bitterness, while again the character in the poem who utters them seems, although forced to do the most wretched and demeaning work, to possess some education. The almost military funeral march in F minor which pervades the song has a fearsome...accompaniment for the pianist, extremely difficilt as it is written.  Only the last two bars of the song are free of accidentals.; and the doleful and pessimistic harmonies, constantly shifting, spell the tota unhappiness and hopelessness of the workman.  Only the mention of walks in the fields on Sundays brings a major key introduction - F Major - and the descending thirds with trills to signify the totally free birds. But this is soon turned back into despairing downward thrustsof the piano as it grows in fierceness and intensity. Iron is in the soul of the singer, for time is against him, time - for him - is out of joint.

Following Strauss, several composers wrote songs that were settings of Dehmel poems, including Reger, Schoenberg, Sibelius and Szymanowski. Hans Erich Pfitzner also set the poem Der Arbeitsmann in his op. 30 (4 Lieder) no. 4 in 1922.

Lyrics

The poem Der Arbeitsmann comes from the volume of Dehmel's poetry titled "Weib und Welt" (Woman and the World), which a German court condemned as obscene and blasphemous, ordering that all copies of it be burned.

Orchestral arrangement

In 1918 Strauss orchestrated the song (completed December 19). The orchestral song was first performed at a lunchtime concert in Berlin on April 20, 1919, sung by tenor Ernst Kraus with the composer conducting the Berlin Philharmonic.  The orchestration is lavish: amongst the largest forces called for in his orchestral songs.

 Piccolo, Two flutes, two oboes, english horn, Eflat Clarinet, two clarinets, two basset horns, bass clarinet, three bassoons, double bassoon.
 Six french horns, two trumpets, three trombones, two tubas
 Bass drum, snare drum
 Strings

The orchestral version of the song was lost for a considerable period of time. It would have been politically unacceptable during the Nazi period. When Norman Del Mar was writing his 1972 biography of Strauss, he came across a 1941 letter to bass-baritone Hans Hotter which mentioned an orchestral version of the song that he had in Vienna that would suit Hotter's voice.  Del Mar dates the orchestration as 1940 (assuming that Strauss had only recently written it before the Hotter letter). He wrote "...it is tantalizing that up to the time of writing no trace of the score or parts has been found, or even evidence that the orchestral version ever reached performance". Since then, the score was found and the song has been performed and recorded.

References
Notes

Sources

Norman Del Mar, Richard Strauss. A Critical Commentary on his Life and Works, Volume 3, London: Faber and Faber (2009)[1968] (second edition), .
Jefferson, Alan. (1971) The Lieder of Richard Straus, Cassel and Company, London.  
Schuh, W. Richard Strauss: A Chronicle of the Early Years 1864-1898, (translated by Mary Wittal), Cambridge University Press, 1982. .
Trenner, Franz (2003) Richard Strauss Chronik, Verlag Dr Richard Strauss Gmbh, Wien, .

Songs about labor
Songs about occupations
Songs by Richard Strauss
1898 songs